Al-Waqa'i' al-Misriyya ( / ALA-LC: al-Waqā’i‘ al-Miṣriyyah; meaning "the Egyptian affairs") was an Egyptian newspaper (now a government information bulletin) established in 1828 on the order of  Muhammad Ali, originally called "Vekayi-i Misriye" and written in Ottoman Turkish in one column with an Arabic translation in a second column (Ottoman Turkish text was in the right one and Arabic text in the left one), and later in Arabic only under the Arabic title.

It was printed at the Amiri Press.

Al-Waqa'i''' was the official gazette of Egypt, and is now published as an appendix of the Official Journal.

Precedents
The newspaper's earliest precedent was Napoleon's Courier de l'Égypte, published every five days (according to another source, every ten days) in four pages in French starting on August 29, 1798, for French propaganda during the French campaign in Egypt and Syria. It included current events, court-martials, and French Army festivities. Inspired by this, the government of Ali Pasha decided to establish the Amiri Press. Although there was no official press policy on what to write, the leader wanted to keep abreast of local and foreign developments and ordered the publication of an official government newspaper. Jurnal al-Khidiw (- lit. "Journal of the Khedive"), a bilingual Turkish–Arabic bulletin first published 1821–1822, was the first printed periodical in Arabic. It was printed irregularly at first, using lithography and with as few as 100 copies per run.

History
Reign of Muhammad Ali Pasha
To enhance readership among the new class of civil servants, he required those who earned at least 1,000 piasters a month to subscribe for 77 piasters and 11 kuruş.] Even French employees not fluent in Arabic or Ottoman Turkish were pursued for collection. In fact, an employee in the Finance Bureau was killed by his son to keep the latter from getting his salary garnished over paternal subscription debt. The Pasha made sure that the paper was published and distributed regularly, even on holidays, together with rations of meat, rice, and ghee.
	
The first page had both translations side-by-side along with the mission statement. There was no regular publication schedule, and issues ranged from three to one times a week or even lagged a fortnight. Mustafa Sami Efendi was appointed the first editor of the Turkish section, and Shihab ad-Din Muhammad Ismail served as his Arabic-language counterpart; both were paid 750 piasters for their work.al-Waqa'i' al-Misriyya apparently inspired the Moniteur ottoman, a francophone gazette published under Mahmud II.

The distinctive original letterhead at first featured a potted plan symbolizing the cotton tree left of the masthead until issue 18, when it was replaced with a pyramid in front of the Sun. Issues 535–540 were printed by Royal Chronicle Press (starting on June 15, 1833, near the end of the First Egyptian–Ottoman War), but production returned to the Amiri Press until Said's reign. A reverent tone was taken to the government.

At-Tahtawi era
In 1842, Rifa'a at-Tahtawi began developing form, content, and style of Al-Waqa'i' al-Misriyya, most notably by focusing more on Arabic language and culture, prioritizing local news over the once-prevalent Ottoman news, and pioneering the publication of book and political editorials. The latter was a source of friction with government officials, leading Khedive Abbas I of Egypt to send him to what was then the colony of Turkish Sudan on accession in 1848, from whence he would return in 1854 when Sa'id of Egypt succeeded Abbas. Under At-Tahtawi's editorship, scholarly articles were published in the paper; his first issue (No. 623 in 1842) included some poems and quotations from the Muqaddimah of Ibn Khaldun.

Reigns of Said and Isma’il Pasha
Sa’id, however, ended official control of publication during his reign (1854–1863) after completing a redesign and pricing it at 120 piasters a year with the director paid 3000 piasters a month and the editor 1500. Sheikh Ahmed Abdelrahim became the first independent editor.

Abduh’s Reforms
In 1880, Prime Minister Riyad Pasha appointed Muhammad Abduh as editor of Al-Waqa'i' al-Misriyya. Abduh emphasized education and social reform as a figure in the turn-of-the-century Arabic Enlightenment or Nahda. Abduh published every day except Friday, and in the wake of the 1882 Anglo-Egyptian War, the paper became completely independent. Now in formal Arabic, it sold advertising for two piasters a line and was available for a penny per issue. Among the luminaries on Abduh's staff were independence pioneer Saad Zaghloul and Ibrahim Al-Helbawi, the first president of the Egypt Bar Association.

Return to official status
In 1911, Al-Waqa'i' al-Misriyya returned to government control, accompanied by a new masthead with a crown centered on the flag of Egypt and shifting advertisements and subscription guides from the left and right margins to the last page. Special issues on Sundays and Thursdays were introduced in 1912. Ahmad Sadiq Bey was appointed director of Amiri Press and editor in 1917 under the auspices of the Ministry of Finance. Although the price was slightly altered by his successor George Newton, form and content remained consistent.

Emile Forgé’s term
Emile Forgé was appointed editor of Al-Waqa'i' al-Misriyya on January 17, 1924, during a time of renewed parliamentary vigor under King Fuad I. Records from Parliament sessions were published as annexes to issues until the Egyptian revolution of 1952. Hassan Ali Kalwa Bey, Forgé's successor, sometimes published the text in green against a frame with calligraphic inscriptions, including a famed royal decree on the birth of King Fuad II. The paper published all royal orders, decrees, Cabinet decisions, and internal cases without editorial independence, though it did not mention the Revolution of July 23, 1952 as it was going on.

Modern history
On January 16, 1954, the coat of arms of Egypt and the Basmala appeared atop the letterhead of Al-Waqa'i' al-Misriyya'' and prices were raised to 30 milliemes a copy and 240 milliemes a line to advertise. Under Gamal Abdel Nasser, the paper was published daily in Arabic and on Thursdays in French. Prices per copy reached 5 piastres in 1966 due to raw materials shortages, but were reduced to just 70 milliemes in 1974. Advertising reached £E6 a line in 1988, the year a postage stamp was issued to commemorate the newspaper's history.

See also 
 List of newspapers in Egypt
 Media of Egypt
 History of Middle Eastern newspapers
 TGC Press Media Museum in Istanbul, Turkey exhibits examples of the newspaper

Notes

References 

1828 establishments in Egypt
Arabic-language newspapers
Newspapers published in Cairo
Publications established in 1828
State media
Government gazettes
Amiri Press publications